John Monyn (before 1376 – 1419 or after) of Dover, Buckland and Canterbury, Kent, was an English politician.

Family
At some point before 1380, Monyn married a woman whose name is unrecorded. Together they had two children, Isabel and Thomas, who also represented Dover in Parliament. Before April 1405, Monyn's first wife had died and he married again. His second wife's name is also unrecorded, but they had one daughter, Alice.

Career
He was a Member (MP) of the Parliament of England for Dover in ?1376, 1378, May 1382, September 1388, January 1390, January 1397, September 1397 and for Canterbury in 1419. He was Mayor of Canterbury in September ?1386–87, 1387–88, 1395–96 and 1403–04.

References

14th-century births
15th-century deaths
English MPs 1376
English MPs 1378
Members of the Parliament of England for Dover
Mayors of Canterbury
English MPs May 1382
English MPs September 1388
English MPs January 1390
English MPs January 1397
English MPs September 1397
English MPs 1419